Frank Arnold may refer to:

 Frank Arnold (basketball) (born 1934), American basketball coach
 Frank Arnold (director), director of Australian TV series
 Frank Arnold (footballer) (1877–1943), Australian rules footballer
 Frank Arnold (umpire) (1851–1929), American baseball umpire
 Frank B. Arnold (1839–1890), New York politician
 Frank D. Arnold, United States Ambassador to El Salvador
 Frank W. Arnold (1851–1917), American trade union functionary

See also
Francis Arnold (disambiguation)